Li Jie (born August 25, 1979 in Xi'an, Shaanxi) is a male Chinese sports shooter who competed in the 2004 Summer Olympics. He won the silver medal in the men's 10 metre air rifle competition. He lives in Xi'an, Shaanxi.

Career
Li Jie burst on the scene at the 2002 Asian Games, where he won two gold medals. One was in the 10m air rifle; the other was with his teammates in the men's group 10m air rifle. In winning the gold, he and his teammates Zhang Fu and Cai Yalin set a new world record with 1788 points. Li Jie also set a new Asian record in the 10m air rifle with 700.8 points. At the 2002 ISSF World Shooting Championships, he won the silver medal in the 10m air rifle and won qualification to the 2004 Athens Olympics. Li Jie also won the 10m air rifle at the 2002 World Cup. He came up big in Athens, taking home silver, and has his sights set on another medal in Beijing Olympics.

Major achievements

2002: Asian Games: First, men's 10m air rifle
2002: World Championships: Second, men's 10m air rifle
2004: Athens ISSF World Cup: Third, men's 10m air rifle
2004: Athens Olympic Games: Second, men's 10m air rifle

External links
 profile

1979 births
Living people
Chinese male sport shooters
ISSF rifle shooters
Olympic shooters of China
Olympic silver medalists for China
Sportspeople from Xi'an
Shooters at the 2004 Summer Olympics
Olympic medalists in shooting
Asian Games medalists in shooting
Shooters at the 2002 Asian Games
Shooters at the 2006 Asian Games
Medalists at the 2004 Summer Olympics
Asian Games gold medalists for China
Medalists at the 2002 Asian Games
Medalists at the 2006 Asian Games
Sport shooters from Shaanxi
20th-century Chinese people
21st-century Chinese people